(Nuevo) Estadio Municipal de La Victoria is a stadium in Jaén, Spain.  It is currently used for football matches and is the home stadium of Real Jaén CF.  The stadium holds 12,569 spectators.

The stadium was opened in 2001 after the demolition of the old Estadio de la Victoria.

References

External links
Estadios de Espana
Stadium information

La Victoria
Football venues in Andalusia
Real Jaén
Sports venues completed in 2001
Sport in Jaén, Spain
Buildings and structures in Jaén, Spain